The Liberal Party (Partai Liberal) is a centre-right conservative-liberal party in East Timor. At the 30 August 2001 elections, the party won 1.1% of the popular vote and 1 out of 88 seats.

Liberal parties in Asia
Political parties in East Timor